Tsaradia is a domestic airline based in Antananarivo, Madagascar. It is a subsidiary of Air Madagascar and commenced operations on 2 July 2018.

History
Tsaradia was launched as a subsidiary of Air Madagascar after a strategic partnering between Air Austral and Air Madagascar. The airline was originally planned to launch in April 2018 but commenced operations on 2 July 2018.

Based out of Ivato International Airport in Antananarivo, Tsaradia serves the domestic markets. As a result, Air Madagascar no longer flies to domestic destinations since they are exclusively served by the Tsaradia subsidiary.

Tsaradia's name translates to "good flight" or "good travel" in Malagasy, the indigenous language of Madagascar. The logo depicts a colorful and stylized leaping ring-tailed lemur, an animal that is endemic to Madagascar.

Fleet
The Tsaradia fleet consists of the following aircraft (as of October 2019):

References

Airlines of Madagascar
Airlines established in 2018
2018 establishments in Africa
Companies based in Antananarivo